Barlaam of Khutyn, also known as Varlaam, was a hermit. Born Alexis Michalevich to a wealthy family from Novgorod. After the death of his parents, he became a hermit on the Volkhov and handed all of his inheritance to the poor. At this time he had gained many followers. So great were their numbers that he founded a monastery, the Khutyn Monastery of Saviour's Transfiguration, and took the name of Barlaam (Varlaam). He died on 6 November 1192, his grave has become a site for pilgrimage.

Varlaam is famous for healing the Grand Prince Vasily (from a family of Riazan boyars) when the prince was visiting Novgorod. Later he became a patron of the city of Vologda. He was also an accomplished painter, and painted several murals in the Gothic style in Novgorod, none of which survived destruction during the Second World War.

References

 Overview at bogolub.narod.ru

12th-century Christian saints
1190s deaths
Russian saints of the Eastern Orthodox Church
Year of birth unknown